Nuri Ja'far Ali al-Chalabi, better known as Nuri Ja'far (1914 – 7 November 1991), was an Iraqi psychologist, philosopher of education, and author. He wrote more than fifty works on pedagogy, psychology, history, philosophy, thought and literature. After graduating from the Higher Teachers' House in Baghdad, he went to the United States, and received a master's degree from Ohio University in 1948 and a doctorate in philosophy from the same university in the following year. He was a student of John Dewey and majored in neuropsychology.

In his late years, he moved to Libya to teach at the University of Tripoli, until his death. Although Ja'far died in 1991, controversy about his death is continued by biographers.

Biography

Early years and education 
Ja'far was born in Al-Qurnah, Basra vilayet. His father, a farmer, and mother, Halimah bint Muhammad Ali Chalabi, were first cousins. Ja'far, referring to his mother, stated that "she was calm, very tolerant, and read the Qur'an, and that was in the 1920s". He also had a brother, Radhi. In 1926, when an elementary school opened in Al-Qurnah, his mother urged his father to enrol him and his brother in the school. The father agreed to enrol only Nuri, not Radhi, because he believed the school would treat Nuri's hyperactivity with punishment. Nuri once stated about his enrolment as follows: 
In school, Ja'far got interested in mathematics, the Arabic language and history. After graduating from high school, he was appointed as a teacher at Al-Qurna Primary School from 18 October 1936 to 31 October 1938. He then worked as an educational inspector from October 1942 until August 1943 in Karbala and Basra. He resigned from the Ministry of Education and was off-duty from 25 October 1943 to 10 January 1950.

Higher educations 

He continued his higher education, held the baccalaureate degree and his papers and went to the capital, Baghdad, to the College of Medicine to fulfil his childhood dream, but was denied admission due to financial conditions. After seeing his tattered clothes, the dean, Harry Sinderson, asked if he would be able to spend 5 dinars on his studies once a month. Ja'far replied "Neither I nor my father saw these 5 dinars [in our life]".

He graduated from the Higher Teachers’ House, which later became the University of Baghdad. Even though he wanted to enter the Faculty of Medicine, and said in an interview "if I had to choose – after I got to know my specialty – I would only enter the Faculty of Education, and if I was asked to specialize, I would only specialize in education and psychology, because in fact it's part of me."

After obtaining a bachelor's degree with distinction, he became a teaching assistant at the Higher Teachers' House, then went to Cairo to study at the Higher Education Institute in the 1940s. Then he was able to get a scholarship to the US in 1945 to complete his education there in master's and doctorate degrees after five years. He studied philosophy of education. John Dewey been his professor and friend and colleague in the educational field. He had personal relations with him while Dewey was retired and not his doctoral advisor,  he was personally associated with him. Nuri Ja'far used to stay with him at home and discussing with him. He stayed with Dewey in his apartment in New York for a whole month, reading and memorizing his works, and at the time he was an Iraqi prominent scholarship student to the US. He received a master's degree from Ohio University in 1948, and a doctorate in philosophy from the same university in 1949.

June 1954 Iraqi parliamentary election 
In 1950, he returned to Iraq and was appointed as director general in the Ministry of Planning from 1959 to 1963, during which time he was researching and writing poetry. He once tried to enter the Iraqi parliament but in what is believed to be an electoral fraud of the June 1954 Iraqi parliamentary election under government of Nuri al-Said, the results of the victory of more than 11 seats for the leftist and democrats were annulled. However, Nuri Jaafar did not give up. He continued his protest and criticism, filled the pages with newspapers about the fraud scandal and canceling the elections until he was summoned by the then Prime Minister Arshad al-Umari, and a convulsive dialogue took place between them. Al-Tamimi expressed that Nuri Jaafar was dismissed from his teaching job after this conversation in which Al-Umari asked Jaafar to stop his criticism of the government and exposing the process of electoral fraud, but Nuri Jaafar refused and said: "I will continue to write in the newspapers, to explain the electoral tragedy of Al-Qurna. The government to do whatever it wants." He later wrote a book about this fraud and published it in 1954, Falsification facts of the parliamentary electoral.

Academic career 
Upon his return of to Baghdad, from 1950 until 1963 he was a professor at the College of Education (formerly High Teachers House), where he graduated. He was dismissed from his academic career in Iraq after the November 1963 coup d'état. His name was in newly-government list of more than 100 professors in various scientific and humanistic disciplines, arranged by their political views, along with other academics, such as Mahdi Makhzumi, Ali Jawad Al-Taher, Abdul-Jabbar Abdullah and others. According to statement No. 13, Nouri's sequence was No. 4. The list of the statement stipulated to “seizure of their movable and immovable funds.”  From 1963 to 1991 he taught in the following universities in Saudi Arabia, Libya, Morocco, United Kingdom, Kuwait, Canada and United States: 1964, Professor and Head of the Department of Psychology in the Faculties of Education and Sharia in Umm al-Qura University; 1965–1969, Professor and Head of the Department of Psychology at the Faculty of Arts in University of Benghazi; 1970 – 1973, Professor and Head of the Department of Psychology at the Faculty of Arts in Mohammed V University; 1974, Visiting professor of psychology at the University of Sheffield; 1975 – 1983, Experienced Professor at the College of Education, University of Baghdad; 1977, Professor at the Faculty of Arts, Kuwait University; 1983, Professor at the University of Montreal; 1984, Professor Emeritus at Purdue University; Finally, 1991, Professor of Postgraduate Studies, Department of Psychology at Al-Fateh University.

Death 
Although it is widely mentioned that he was killed by a Libyan taxi driver on his way to the Tripoli International Airport to travel to London, his family members who were with him stated that he died one year after the so-called taxi incident. His youngest daughter, Nujood said he died in 1991 at the age of 77 due to a heart ailment: Nujood states that her father's murder by the Libyan driver is completely unfounded.

Another source stated that he died on 7 November 1991 in Salah al-Din Hospital in Tripoli, Libya, due to complications from the flu, and confirms that everything published about his death of the assassination by a thief is untrue. Kadhim Abbud Fatlawi spoke to one of Ja'far's relatives called Muhammad bin Jassim Al-Chalabi, just stated that he passed in Tripoli, Libya, on 29 Rabi' al-Thani 1412/6-7 November 1991  the same as Kamel Salman al-Jaburi, another Iraqi biographer.

Personal life 
Nur Ja'far married later in life to a woman who was 20 years younger than him who came from an upper-class family and died in 1975 in the UK.  They had three daughters and one son: Alya', Kholood, Najood (born May 1964) and Ali.  Nur Ja'far once described himself “I am the head of a family, a father, a mother, a friend and a loyal guard". In the words of his youngest daughter Nujoud, "My father became our mother and father at the same time, feeling unparalleled tenderness and care to fill the void with our mother's departure in 1975 in an indescribable way, embracing us with his loyal love. He enlisted his life and sacrificed the rest of his life for his knowledge and for us, as he used to repeat to our ears: Your mother left you as a trust."

Works 
He wrote more than 50 books in Arabic and English, including:

 , 1950
 ,  1954
 ,  1954
 ,  1954
 ,  1955
 ,  1956
 ,  1957
 ,  1958
 ,  1958
 ,  1959
 ,  1962
 , 1970
 ,  1971
 ,  1971
 ,  1976
 ,  1978
 ,  1978
 ,  1978
 ,  1979
 ,  1981
 ,  1981
 ,  1982
 ,  1983
 , 1985
 ,  1986
 ,  1986
 ,  1987
 ,  1987
 ,  1978
 , 1987
 ,  1987
 ,  1990
 ,  1991

In English:
 The Philosophy of Boyd H. Bode with Special Consideration of Its Meaning for Education in Iraq, 1949
 Creativity and Brain Mechanism, 1976
 Fandamentals of Neuropsychology, 1988

References

Citations

Sources

External links 
  

1914 births
1991 deaths
University of Baghdad alumni
Ohio University alumni
People from Basra Province
Iraqi psychologists
Neuropsychologists
Philosophers of education
Iraqi philosophers
Academic staff of Umm al-Qura University
Academic staff of the University of Benghazi
Academic staff of Mohammed V University
Academics of the University of Sheffield
Academic staff of the University of Baghdad
Academic staff of Kuwait University
Academic staff of the Université de Montréal
Purdue University faculty
Academic staff of the University of Tripoli
Iraqi expatriates in Canada
Iraqi expatriates in England
Iraqi expatriates in Kuwait
Iraqi expatriates in Libya
Iraqi expatriates in Saudi Arabia
Iraqi expatriates in the United States
1991 controversies
Controversies in Iraq
Cairo University alumni
Iraqi schoolteachers